Global Drama is a 2008 studio album by the Swedish metal band Cloudscape. It is the band's third studio album, and the last to feature their founding lineup of Roger Landin (drums), Haynes Pherson (bass) and Björn Eliasson (guitar). Two musicvideos (Cloak & Daggers and Darkest Legacy) were released to promote Global Drama. The Opening track "Mind Diary" was featured as download to the video game Rock Band 3.

Personnel
Mike Andersson - Lead & Backing Vocals
Björn Eliasson - Guitars
Patrik Svärd - Guitars
Haynes Pherson - Bass & Backing Vocals
Roger Landin - Drums & Percussion

References

External links 
 

2008 albums
Cloudscape albums